James Graham may refer to:

Baronets
 Sir James Graham, 1st Baronet, of Kirkstall (1753–1825), Tory MP for Cockermouth, Wigtown Burghs and Carlisle
 Sir James Graham, 1st Baronet, of Netherby (1761–1824), MP for Ripon 1798–1807
 Sir James Graham, 2nd Baronet (1792–1861), First Lord of the Admiralty, MP 1812–61 for Hull, St Ives, Carlisle, Cumberland, East Cumberland, Pembroke, Dorchester, Ripon

Military
 James Grahme or Graham (1649–1730), English army officer, courtier, politician and Jacobite
 James Graham (British Army soldier) (1791–1845), British soldier commended for bravery at the Battle of Waterloo
 James A. Graham (1940–1967), United States Marine and Medal of Honor recipient
 James Duncan Graham (1799–1865), member of the Corps of Topographical Engineers

Noblemen
 James Graham, 1st Marquess of Montrose (1612–1650), Scottish nobleman and soldier
 James Graham, 2nd Marquess of Montrose (1631–1669), Scottish nobleman and judge
 James Graham, 3rd Marquess of Montrose (1657–1684) 
 James Graham, 1st Duke of Montrose (1682–1742), Scottish aristocratic statesman (was 4th Marquess)
 James Graham, 3rd Duke of Montrose (1755–1836), British statesman
 James Graham, 4th Duke of Montrose (1799–1874), British politician - Member for Cambridge
 James Graham, 6th Duke of Montrose (1878–1954), Scottish nobleman, politician and engineer
 James Graham, 7th Duke of Montrose (1907–1992), signatory to the Rhodesian Declaration of Independence
 James Graham, 8th Duke of Montrose (born 1935), member of the House of Lords
 James Graham, Marquess of Graham (born 1973), Scottish aristocrat

Politicians and political activists
 James Graham (speaker) (1650–1701), merchant, lawyer and Speaker of the New York General Assembly
 James Graham (North Carolina politician) (1793–1851), United States Representative from North Carolina
 James H. Graham (1812–1881), United States Representative from New York 
 James Graham (Victorian politician) (1819–1898), merchant and member of the Victorian Legislative Council
 James Graham Fair (1831–1894), United States senator
 James McMahon Graham (1852–1945), United States Representative from Illinois 
 Sir James Graham (physician) (1856–1913), Scottish-Australian physician and New South Wales politician
 James D. Graham (1873–1951), American socialist politician from Montana
 James Callan Graham (1914–2006), member of the Texas House of Representatives
 James Allen Graham (1921–2003), North Carolina teacher and politician
 James B. Graham (1923-2007), Kentucky Auditor of Public Accounts
 Jim Graham (1945–2017), American politician from Washington D.C.

Sportsmen
 James Graham (sport shooter) (1870–1950), American sports shooter
 James Graham (rugby union) (1884–1941), New Zealand rugby union player
 Jim Graham (footballer) (1892–1957), Australian rules footballer
 James Graham (cricketer) (1906–1942), Irish cricketer
 Jimmy Graham (footballer) (born 1969), Scottish association footballer
 James Graham (rugby league) (born 1985), English rugby league footballer
 Jimmy Graham (born 1986) American football player
 James Graham (baseball) 19th-century baseball player
 James Graham (footballer) (dates unknown), association footballer
 James Graham (gymnast) British Olympic gymnast
 Jimmy Graham (cricketer) (1875–1942), Scottish cricketer

Others
 James Graham (sexologist) (1745–1794), Scottish pioneer in sex therapy
 James Gillespie Graham (1776–1855), Scottish architect
 James Graham (photographer) (1806–1869), took some of the earliest photographs of Palestine
 Wes Graham (James Wesley Graham, 1932–1999), Order of Canada recipient in 1999
 James L. Graham (born 1939), U.S. federal judge
 James Martin Graham (1956–1997), American Roman Catholic priest, and Director of the International Christian AIDS Network (ICAN)
 James Graham (artist) (born 1961), founding director of the Museum of Contemporary Art in Tucson, Arizona
 James Graham (playwright) (born 1982), British playwright
 James Graham (singer) (born 1996), singer and member of the band Stereo Kicks
 James A. Graham (psychologist), American child psychologist
 James David Provins Graham (1914–1989), Scottish physician, pharmacologist and academic author
 James R. Graham, Irish astrophysicist,  at the University of California
 James Lorimer Graham Jr. (1835–1876), American consul in Florence
 James Methuen Graham (1882–1962), Scottish surgeon
 Jamie Graham, chief constable of Vancouver

See also

James Graeme (disambiguation)
 Graham (surname)